Queen of Housewives (also known as My Wife Is a Superwoman) is a 2009 South Korean romantic comedy television series, starring Kim Nam-joo, Oh Ji-ho, Yoon Sang-hyun, Lee Hye-young, Choi Cheol-ho, and Sunwoo Sun. It depicts the life of "naejo," housewives who devote their entire lives to their husbands' success, but with a more comedic and aggressive twist. It aired on MBC from March 16 to May 19, 2009 on Mondays and Tuesdays at 21:55 for 20 episodes.

The hit drama topped the ratings chart during its run, and created new trends among married women in terms of fashion and makeup. Actress Kim Nam-joo received numerous accolades for her acting comeback after an 8-year hiatus, and the series also served as the breakout vehicle of actor Yoon Sang-hyun.

Plot
Chun Ji-ae (Kim Nam-joo) had it all... in high school. Pretty and popular, she was the school's queen bee, while awkward Yang Bong-soon (Lee Hye-young) was the exact opposite. The two were initially friends, until Ji-ae stole Bong-soon's crush, Han Joon-hyuk (Choi Cheol-ho). Fast-forward to middle-aged married life, and their roles have become reversed. Ji-ae struggles with household finances because she married Ohn Dal-soo (Oh Ji-ho), a once-promising university graduate turned unemployed pushover, while Joon-hyuk, whom Bong-soon married after Ji-ae dumped him, is now a successful executive.

Dal-soo finally gets a shot at a decent job at top company Queen's Food, where Joon-hyuk happens to be his new boss. Joon-hyuk still carries a torch for Ji-ae, and he makes it a point to make Dal-soo's internship as difficult and demeaning as possible. Meanwhile, determined to help her smart but clueless husband climb the corporate ladder, Ji-ae joins a social wives club to support him. The wives' power plays are directly correlative to their husbands' positions in the company (meaning, the higher-ranking the husband, the higher-ranking the wife), and Ji-ae sets aside her pride to curry favor and jockey for position. She immediately thrives within the wives' inner circle, but she's constantly thwarted by her ex-best friend, Bong-soon.

Then Dal-soo runs into his college friend Eun So-hyun (Sunwoo Sun), wife of Heo Tae-joon (Yoon Sang-hyun), the current president of Queen's Food. Stuck in a loveless marriage, So-hyun wants to have an affair with Dal-soo, while indolent chaebol Tae-joon gradually finds himself attracted to Ji-ae. The three couples interact in a confusing mix of romance, friendship, and workplace politics.

Cast

Main characters
 Kim Nam-joo as Chun Ji-ae
 Oh Ji-ho as Ohn Dal-soo
 Lee Hye-young as Yang Bong-soon
 Yoon Sang-hyun as Heo Tae-joon
 Choi Cheol-ho as Han Joon-hyuk
 Sunwoo Sun as Eun So-hyun
 Kim Chang-wan as Kim Hong-shik
 Na Young-hee as Jang Young-sook

Supporting characters
Ji-ae and Bong-soon's high school classmates
 Park Joo-hee as Go Mi-young
 Lee Seung-ah as Kim Young-sun
 Jung Soo-young as Ji Hwa-ja
 Kim Do-yeon as Ahn Jung-sook

Queen's Food husbands and wives
 Kim Yong-hee as Ha-chang
 Choi Ye-jin as Hwang-sook (Ha-chang's wife)
 Kim Jung-hak as Department chief Yang
 Hwang Hyo-eun as Lee Seul (chief Yang's wife)
 Hwang Jae-hee as Gong Young-min (HR manager's nephew)
 Joo Min-ha as Jung Go-woon (Young-min's wife, art gallery assistant)
 Lee Mae-ri as Jung-ran

Extended cast
 Kang Soo-han as Han Hyuk-chan (Bong-soon and Joon-hyuk's son)
 Kim Sung-kyum as President Heo (Tae-joon's father)
 Yu Ji-in as Tae-joon's mother
 Kim Young-ran as Ji-ae's mother
 Baek Seung-hee as Hyang-suk
 Kim Ik-tae as jeweller
 Min Joon-hyun as Ohn Dal-soo's co-worker
 Lee Seung-ho 
 Kim Seung-woo as police officer (cameo, ep 3)
 Shindong as couple in sauna (cameo, ep 11)
 Kim Shin-young as couple in sauna (cameo, ep 11)
 Kim Sung-min as Tae-joon's friend (cameo, ep 16)
 Jun Jin as job applicant (cameo, ep 20)
 Yoo Jae-suk as job applicant (cameo, ep 20)
 Park Myung-soo as job applicant (cameo, ep 20)
 Jung Hyung-don as job applicant (cameo, ep 20)

Ratings

Source: TNS Media Korea

Awards and nominations

International broadcast
Philippines: IBC, title "My Wife is a Superwoman"

References

External links
Queen of Housewives official MBC website 

MBC TV television dramas
2009 South Korean television series debuts
2009 South Korean television series endings
Korean-language television shows
Television shows written by Park Ji-eun
Television series by Doremi Entertainment